is a Japanese film director and screenwriter. An alumnus of the University of Tokyo and the Tokyo National University of Fine Arts and Music, he started getting attention in his home country with the graduate film Passion (2008).

Hamaguchi first gained international recognition with the film Happy Hour (2015) and continued with Asako I & II (2018). In 2021, he released two films, Wheel of Fortune and Fantasy and  Drive My Car, for the latter he has received two Academy Awards nominations, for Best Director and Best Adapted Screenplay. He is the third Japanese director to be nominated for an Oscar for Best Director.

Career
After graduating from the University of Tokyo, Hamaguchi worked in the commercial film industry for a few years before entering the graduate program in film at Tokyo University of the Arts where he studied with and was influenced by Kiyoshi Kurosawa. His graduation film Passion was selected for the competition of the 2008 Tokyo Filmex.

With Kō Sakai, he made a three-part documentary about survivors of the 2011 Tōhoku earthquake and tsunami, with Voices from the Waves being selected for the competition at the 2013 Yamagata International Documentary Film Festival, and Storytellers winning the Sky Perfect IDEHA Prize.

His next film, Happy Hour, was first developed while Hamaguchi was an artist in residence at KIITO Design and Creative Center Kobe in 2013. It came out of an improvisational acting workshop he held for non-professionals, with many of the film's performers having participated in the workshop. The four lead actresses shared the best actress award and the film earned a special mention for its script at the 2015 Locarno Film Festival. Hamaguchi was also given a special jury award at the 2016 Japan Movie Critic Awards, as well as a best newcomer award in the film division of the Agency for Cultural Affairs's Geijutsu Sensho Awards that year.

His Asako I & II was selected to compete for the Palme d'Or at the 2018 Cannes Film Festival.

In 2021, Hamaguchi won the Silver Bear award at the Berlinale with his Wheel of Fortune and Fantasy. That same year his Drive My Car won Best Picture awards from the New York Film Critics Circle, Boston Society of Film Critics, and Los Angeles Film Critics Association as well as "Best Motion Picture - Non-English Language" at the Golden Globes. Hamaguchi was nominated for an Oscar for Best Director for Drive My Car, becoming the third Japanese director to accomplish this feat.

Influences and style
Hamaguchi has referred to himself as "purely a cinephile" and "conventionally in love with Hollywood films." He has been influenced by the works of John Cassavetes.

Quotes 
 "To some extent, all films are fiction and documentary at the same time. I have experienced to make both, and I believe there is no such thing as pure fiction or pure documentary."
 "The actor is acting in front of the camera. What the camera captures there is a documentary about the actors, because they're doing something which happens only once."
 (On the multilingual staging in Drive My Car) "In a multilingual staging, of course, they're not understanding the meaning of the words. Instead, the body language and the voice tones is what becomes more important to convey those feelings or the emotional state of the respective actors. It becomes easier to focus and react. That's a nice way I look at it to get a more simple and strong performance."
 (On the ending of Drive My Car) "Once I talked with a big fan of Drive My Car who said that it really would have been perfect without that ending. (Laugh) Well, I think maybe the reason I ended that way is to make it a bit imperfect." "In terms of the final staging of the play in applause, if I had ended the movie at that point, presumably the audience would want to do a round of applause, and it would almost be like closing of a full circle. But for me that didn't really feel like a satisfying ending. I wanted to do something a bit more disruptive, to leave some sort of break."
 (On the ending of Drive My Car) "I have no any plans of making a sequel, but I was just sort of playing around with things at the end there. One other thing I'd like to say is that the title itself also might give a clue to how you can interpret the ending."

Filmography

Awards

References

External links
 

1978 births
Living people
Japanese film directors
Japanese screenwriters
People from Kanagawa Prefecture
Tokyo University of the Arts alumni
University of Tokyo alumni
Cannes Film Festival Award for Best Screenplay winners
Directors of Best Foreign Language Film Academy Award winners